Kafr 'Ana' (also: Kafr Ana) was a Palestinian town located  east of Jaffa, built on the ancient site of Ono.  In 1945, the town had an estimated population of 2,800 Arabs and 220 Jews. Captured by the pre-state Jewish forces of the Alexandroni Brigade prior to the outbreak of the 1948 Arab–Israeli War, it was depopulated.
Today, the old village site lies within the confines of the modern Israeli city of Or Yehuda.

History
Remains from the Chalcolithic Period and forward have been found here.  The Canaanites and Israelites referred to the town as Ono, which name continued all throughout the First and Second Temple periods.

Byzantine period
Jewish classical writings mention the city as being formerly enclosed by a wall.  Kafr 'Ana was known as Onous in the Byzantine era, and ceramics from that era have been found here. Kafr 'Ana actually represents a Byzantine-period expansion of a nearby and much older site –– Kafr Juna, believed to be the ancient Ono.

Ottoman period
During early Ottoman rule in Palestine, the revenues of the village of Kafr 'Ana were in 1557 designated for the new waqf of Hasseki Sultan Imaret in Jerusalem, established by Hasseki Hurrem Sultan (Roxelana), the wife of Suleiman the Magnificent. The population was 11 households, all Muslim. They paid a fixed tax-rate of 25% on agricultural products, including wheat, barley, summer crops, vineyards,  fruit trees, sesame, goats and beehives; in addition to occasional revenues,  a total of 26,800 akçe. All of the revenue went to a  waqf.

In 1838, Kefr Ana  was noted as a Muslim village  in the Lydda District.

French explorer Victor Guérin visited the village in 1863 and found it to have 500 inhabitants. He further noted that "near the village are two shallow basins hollowed in rock, not built up, which receive the winter rains. Several wells are here as well, which permit the gardens to be irrigated. By the side of one of these wells I observed trunks of columns which seemed ancient."

An Ottoman village list of about 1870  counted 156 houses and a population of  499, though  the population count included men, only.

In 1882, the PEF's Survey of Western Palestine described Kafr 'Ana as a village built of adobe bricks and surrounded by palm trees.

British Mandate period

In the 1922 census of Palestine conducted by the British Mandate authorities, Kufr 'Ana had a population of 1,374 inhabitants, all Muslims. increasing the 1931 census to 1,824, still all Muslims, in a total of 449 houses.

The villagers grew crops and raised poultry and bees. In  the 1944/45 statistics  a total 2,214 dunums were used for growing citrus and bananas, while 11,022 dunums of village land was used for cereals. 597 dunums were irrigated or used for orchards,  while 90 dunams were classified as built-up areas.

State of Israel

The village of Kafr 'Ana was depopulated in the weeks leading up to the 1948 Arab–Israeli War, during the Haganah's offensive Mivtza Hametz (Operation Hametz) 28–30 April 1948. This operation was held against a group of villages east of Jaffa, including Kafr 'Ana. According to the preparatory orders, the objective was for "opening the way [for Jewish forces] to Lydda". Though there was no explicit mention of the prospective treatment of the villagers, the order spoke of "cleansing the area" [tihur hashetah]. The final operational order stated: "Civilian inhabitants of places conquered would be permitted to leave after they are searched for weapons."

On 23 September 1948 General Avner named Kafr 'Ana as a suitable village for resettlement for new Jewish immigrants ("olim") to Israel. Today, the modern Israeli city, Or Yehuda, is built upon the lands formerly belonging to Kafr 'Ana and Saqiya village and Kheiriya village. Or Yehuda was founded in 1950, on village land, south of the village site.

In 1992 the village site was described: "Part of the site is a vacant lot. On other parts, olive trees grow, along with cypress and eucalyptus trees that have been planted by the residents of the Israeli settlements. No traces of the old houses can be discerned. Apartment buildings and a small park have been built on the surrounding land."

Culture
A woman's thob (loose fitting robe with sleeves), from Kafr Ana, from the 1930s, is in the Museum of International Folk Art (MOIFA) collection at Santa Fe, United States. The dress is of white commercial cotton and the embroidery is multicolored cotton, mainly in red and blue. The qabbeh (the square chest panel) is not a separate panel, but instead executed directly on the dress. The embroidery on the skirt and sleeves is also done directly on the dress. There is some machine embroidery, but most is by hand. The dress has an uncommon round neckline, which was an innovation and was only used here and in the village of Salama, near Jaffa.

See also
 Depopulated Palestinian locations in Israel
 Palestinian costumes

References

Bibliography

External links
Palestine Remembered - Kafr 'Ana
Survey of Western Palestine, Map 13: IAA,  Wikimedia commons
Kafr 'Ana, Zochrot
Kafr 'Ana from the Khalil Sakakini Cultural Center

District of Jaffa
Arab villages depopulated prior to the 1948 Arab–Israeli War
Canaanite cities
Ancient Jewish settlements of Judaea